The 182nd–183rd Streets station is a local station on the IND Concourse Line of the New York City Subway. It is served by D train at all times except rush hours in the peak direction and the B train during rush hours.

History 
This station was built as part of the IND Concourse Line, which was one of the original lines of the city-owned Independent Subway System (IND). The route of the Concourse Line was approved to Bedford Park Boulevard on June 12, 1925 by the New York City Board of Transportation. Construction of the line began in July 1928. The station opened on July 1, 1933, along with the rest of the Concourse subway.

Station layout

This underground station has three tracks and two side platforms. The center track is used by the D express train during rush hours in the peak direction.

Both platforms have a Claret red trim line with a black border and mosaic name tablets reading "182ND-183RD ST." in white sans-serif lettering on a black background with a Claret red border. Below the trim line are tile captions in white lettering on a black background showing "182" in the south half of the station and "183" in the north half, similar to the arrangement at the 174th–175th Streets station. There are also directional tile captions below the name tablet mosaics.

Hunter green i-beams run along the platforms at regular intervals with alternating ones having the standard black station name plate with white lettering.

Exits
The mezzanine used to be full length, but has been reduced in size. Because of this, the station's name is a misnomer. Crossovers between the two directions are allowed only from the northernmost set of stairs. The only open exits are at all four corners of 182nd Street and Grand Concourse. A gated-off passageway on the north end of the mezzanine lead to a former booth and exits to all four corners of 183rd Street. The stairs have been sealed on street level as early as 1996.

There were two additional exits at the south end that lead to both sides of the Grand Concourse and Anthony Avenue (between East 181st and 182nd Streets). At the request of the local community, these exits and the passageway leading to them were temporarily closed in January 1989 due to low usage, safety hazards and because vandals and criminals frequented the area. After the hearings took place in February and March the same year, these exits were completely shuttered after June 1989 and the stairs were also sealed on street level. However, the entrance structures remained on street level as early as June 1994.

References

External links 

 
 Station Reporter — B Train
 Station Reporter — D Train
 The Subway Nut — 182nd–183rd Streets Pictures 
 182nd Street entrance from Google Maps Street View
 Platforms from Google Maps Street View

IND Concourse Line stations
New York City Subway stations in the Bronx
Railway stations in the United States opened in 1933
Fordham, Bronx
1933 establishments in New York City